is a common Japanese given name. While it is a unisex name, it is more commonly used by women. It can also be used as a surname.

Possible writings
Natsuki can be written using different kanji characters and can mean:
as a given name
夏稀, "summer, rare"
夏生, "summer, life"
夏紀, "summer, chronicle"
夏樹, "summer, wood"
夏姫, "summer, princess"
夏希, "summer, hope" 
菜月, "greens, moon"
菜月, "Rapeseed flower, moon"
那月, "rich/beautiful, moon"
夏妃, "summer, queen"
夏季, "summer, seasons"
懐季, "reminiscence, yearn, seasons"
懐希, "reminiscence, yearn, hope"
ナツキ, katakana for "Natsuki"
なつき, hiragana for "Natsuki"

as a surname
夏木, "summer, tree"
夏樹, "summer, wood"

People

Given name
Natsuki Ikezawa (池澤 夏樹, born 1945), Japanese poet, novelist, essayist, and translator
Natsuki Katō (加藤 夏希, born 1985), Japanese actress
Natsuki Hanae (花江 夏樹, born 1991), Japanese voice actor and singer
Natsuki Harada (原田 夏希, born 1984), a Japanese actress
Natsuki Mizu (水 夏希, born 1972), a Japanese musical actress who was a member of the all-female musical troupe, Takarazuka Revue from 2006 to 2010
Natsuki Nidaira (仁平 菜月, born 1998), Japanese badminton player
Natsuki Oie (大家 夏稀, born 1998), Japanese badminton player
Natsuki Okamoto (岡本 奈月, born 1989), a Japanese fashion model and actress
Natsuki Sumeragi (皇 名月 or 皇 なつき, born 1967), Japanese illustrator and manga artist who is famous for incorporating both Korean and Chinese history into her works
Natsuki Takaya (高屋 奈月, born 1973), Japanese manga artist best known for creating the manga series, Fruits Basket
Natsuki Nishi (born 1972), Japanese Olympic sprint canoer
Natsuki Sato (佐藤 夏希, born 1990), J-pop singer and former member of the all-female Japanese idol group AKB48
Natsuki Taiyo (水嶋 なつみ, born 1984), Japanese professional wrestler
Natsuki Ozawa (小沢 なつき, born 1972), Japanese singer, actress, and AV idol

Surname
Yōko Natsuki (夏樹 陽子, born 1952), Japanese actress
Rio Natsuki (夏樹 リオ, born 1969), Japanese voice actress
Mari Natsuki (中島 淳子, born 1952), Japanese singer, dancer and actress

Fictional characters
Natsuki, a character from the manga Bad Company
Natsuki, a character from the visual novel game Doki Doki Literature Club!
Natsuki Kuga (なつき), a character from the anime series My-HiME
Natsuki Kruger (ナツキ), a character from the anime series My-Otome
Natsuki Shinohara, a character from the animated movie Summer Wars
Natsuki Smith-Mizuki, a character from the manga Shonan Junai Gumi
Natsuki Mamiya (菜月), a main character from the 2006 Japanese tokusatsu series, GoGo Sentai Boukenger
Natsuki Kisumi, the title character of Natsuki Crisis, a Japanese manga and 2 episode OVA
Musashi Natsuki (夏木六三四), the title character of Musashi no Ken
Natsuki Shinomiya (那月), a character from the otome game series Uta no Prince-sama
Natsuki Nakagawa  (中川 夏紀), a character from the anime Sound! Euphonium
Rin Natsuki, a character from the anime Yes! Pretty Cure 5
Subaru Natsuki, protagonist of the light novel series Re:Zero − Starting Life in Another World

Japanese-language surnames
Japanese unisex given names